Valeriy Feliksovych Ivanov (born July 19, 1961) is a Ukrainian journalist, specialist in mass communications, Doctor of Philology, and professor. The President of the Academy of the Ukrainian Press since April 2001. 
. The author of the first Ukrainian textbook in "The Ethics of Journalism". The member of the National Union of Journalists and the Journalistic Ethics Commission. Head of Advertising and Public Relations Department of the Institute of Journalism at the Taras Shevchenko National University of Kyiv.

Biography 
Valery Ivanov was born in Luhansk on July 19, 1961. Valeriy's father is a mining engineer and his mother is a chemical engineer.  His career began at the age of 17 when he got a job at the Voroshilovgradskaya 1–2 mine in the Vorokhilovgradshakhtoprokhodka Association.

He was educated at the local pedagogical institute
 (now university), where he studied at the History Department. In 1988 he became a graduate student, research assistant, and associate professor of journalism at Shevchenko National University of Kyiv. Since 1995 he has been working as Deputy Director for Research. In 1996 he defended his doctoral dissertation in "The Methodology and Methods of Researching the Content of Mass Communication." Since 1997, he has been a Professor of the Department of Periodicals, and later he became the Head of the Department of Organization of Mass Media of the Institute of Journalism at Taras Shevchenko National University.

Since 2001 he has been leading of the Academy of the Ukrainian Press, which is a non-profit, non-governmental and independent organization. It was founded in 2001 and has received support from the European and American organizations The Academy of the Ukrainian Press promotes informed and critical media consumption by the Ukrainian public and compliance with the socially responsible journalism standards in Ukraine.

Science work 
Professor Ivanov is the author and co-author of more than 500 research papers, including 30 monographs, 10 textbooks, 26 manuals, and 48 brochures.
Main works:
 Это нашей истории строки (Производительный труд учащихся и студентов Луганщины на страницах молодежной печати). – Луганск: Молодёжное научно-экономическое объединение, 1990. – 294 с.
 Контент-аналіз: Методологія і методика дослідження: Навчальний посібник. – К.: ІСДО, 1994. – 112 с.
 Теоретико-методологічні основи вивчення змісту масової комунікації / За наук. ред. А.З. Москаленко. – К., 1996. – 202 с. 
 Experience of Content Analysis: Models and Practices. – Kyiv: Center for Free Press, 2005. – 234 p. соавт. Kostenko N.V.)
 News vs. news: The election campaign in the TV news programs. – Kyiv: CFP, 2005. – 204 p. (Kostenko N.)
 Журналістська етика: 3-є вид., випр. – К.: Видавничо-поліграфічний центр «Київський університет», 2008. – 224 с. (соавт. В.Сердюк)
 Практикум із журналістської етики: Навчальний посібник / Передм. В.П.  Мостового; Під ред. проф. Іванова. – 2-ге вид., стереотип. – К.: Видавець О.Зень, 2012. 320 с. (свівавтор С.В.Штурхецький)
 Массовая коммуникация: Монография. – К.: АУП, ЦВП, 2013. – 902 с. 
 Медіаосвіта та медіаграмотність: Підручник / Ред.-упор. В.Ф.Іванов, О.В.Волошенюк; За науковою редакцією В.В.Різуна; Видання третє зі змінами та доповненнями. – К.: ЦВП, АУП, 2014. – 432 с. (співавт.)
 Журналістська етика: Посібник для підготовки до державного іспиту / За ред. В.П. Мостового та В.В. Різуна. – Київ, ТзОВ «ЗН УА», 2014. – 224 с. (співавт.)
 Соціологія масової комунікації / http://journlib.univ.kiev.ua/lectures/IvanovSMC.pdf
 Сучасні методики контент-аналізу: Навчальний посібник. – К.: Кондор, 2018. – 416 с. (співавт.)

Awards 
 In 1992, Ivanov received the gold medal from NASU for winning the young scientists competition. http://static.rada.gov.ua/intranet/ukrzmi/human/0132832.htm
 Certificate of Merit of the Verkhovna Rada of Ukraine (2009).

External links 
 «Журналистская этика» — учебник
 Valery Ivanov talking about journalistic investigations, 2010, blog in UT
 Valery Ivanov talking about the media in the pre-election period, 2014, broadcast with Mykola Veresen
 Валерий Иванов. Valery Ivanov. Basic theories of mass communication, 2010, textbook
 Ivanov: The task of media educators is to teach children to distinguish between high and low-quality media products, 2013, interview with Diana Dutsykк

References 

1961 births
People from Luhansk
Academic staff of the Taras Shevchenko National University of Kyiv
Ukrainian journalists
Living people